Zanies Comedy Club, located in Chicago, Illinois, was founded in November 1978 by Rick Uchwat. Since then, three other locations have been built: Nashville, Tennessee, St.Charles, Illinois, and Rosemont, Illinois.

Rick Uchwat
Rick Uchwat was born in Austria in 1947. At 4 years old he came to Chicago through refugee camps and Ellis Island. His father was imprisoned by the Nazis during World War II and was held in the Auschwitz Concentration Camp. He attended DePaul University for a short time until eventually joining the US Marines. In 1968, Uchwat was sent to Vietnam and was badly injured during the Tet Offensive. Uchwat married Barbara Monahan in 1977. At the age of 64, May 12, 2011, Uchwat died after a battle with lung cancer.

History

Jay Leno describes the venue as "the perfect comedy club. Playing there in the 70s was like playing the Cavern Club in Liverpool".

In 1985, Zanies became "arguably the king of Chicago's comedy clubs". Comedy exploded during the last couple of years.

"Drinks were ordered. The music stopped. A man walked to the stage. And then it started, the laughter. The blissful disease, so easily contagious."

In 1998, Zanies hosted the Chicago Comedy Festival.

July 2012, Zanies opens up a location in Rosemont, Illinois.

In 2008, Zanies celebrates their 30th anniversary.

August 2014, Zanies Comedy Club hosts a tribute to Robin Williams.

Zanies Comedy Club in Chicago celebrates their 40th Anniversary and continues to deliver nationally touring headliners 7 nights out of the week.

Notable performers

Zanies played an influential part in the careers of many comedians including, Jay Leno, Lewis Black, Annie Rauwerda, Emo Philips, Richard Lewis, Jerry Seinfeld, Frank Caliendo, Kathy Griffin, Larry Reeb, John Caponera, Hal Sparks, Bobby Slayton, and Roseanne Barr.

Other notable performers include: Sebastian Maniscalco, Colin Jost, Tiffany Haddish, Kevin Hart, Hannibal Buress, Bill Burr, Jimmy Fallon, Jimmy Pardo, John Mulaney, Sarah Silverman,  Aziz Ansari, Tim Allen, Jeff Garlin, Jim Gaffigan, Chelsea Handler, David Cross, Chris Rock, Dave Chappelle, Daniel Tosh, Gilbert Gottfried, Chelsea Handler, Kyle Kinane, Erik Griffin, Big Jay Oakerson, Pat McGann, Mark Normand, Jared Freid, Andrew Schulz, Jermaine Fowler, David Koechner, Maz Jobrani, Vir Das, Ronny Chieng, Al Madrigal, Marc Maron, Tony Hinchcliffe, and Dave Attell.

Locations
Zanies has four locations, three of which are located in Illinois. The clubs are open every night of the week and have a minimum age requirement for attendance of 21 years with the exception of the Nashville club where the minimum age is 18 years.

 Chicago, Illinois, opened in 1978
 St. Charles, Illinois, opened in 1989 and seats 250
 Rosemont, Illinois, opened in 2012 and seats 250
 Nashville, Tennessee, opened 1983 and seats around 300
Zanies Nashville is a 2013 Comedy Central Certified Club.

Former locations
 Vernon Hills, Illinois, closed in 2011

St Charles closed on 11/30/2019.

Mount Prospect location 2200 Elmhurst road - closed in 1998. 6 years after Jay Leno hosted two free shows on February 14, 1992 to anyone who could show an unemployment stub.

References

External links
 Zanies' main website
 Zanies at Chicago
 Zanies at St. Charles
 Zanies at Rosemont
 Zanies at Nashville

Business in Chicago
Culture of Nashville, Tennessee
Comedy clubs in the United States
1978 establishments in Illinois
Theatres in Chicago
Tourist attractions in Nashville, Tennessee
Nightclubs in Illinois
Tourist attractions in Cook County, Illinois